The 1984 Virginia Cavaliers football team represented the University of Virginia during the 1984 NCAA Division I-A football season. The Cavaliers were led by third-year head coach George Welsh and played their home games at Scott Stadium in Charlottesville, Virginia. They competed as members of the Atlantic Coast Conference, finishing in second.

The season was a historically successful one for Virginia. The school made their first appearance in the AP Poll in over 30 years when they entered at number 19 in week 11. Finishing the regular season with a 7–2–2 record, they were invited to Virginia's first ever bowl game, the 1984 Peach Bowl, where they defeated Purdue. They were ranked in the final AP Poll for the second time in school history and the first time since 1951, coming in at 20th.

Schedule

A.Clemson was under NCAA probation, and was ineligible for the ACC title. Therefore this game did not count in the league standings.

Personnel

References

Virginia
Virginia Cavaliers football seasons
Peach Bowl champion seasons
Virginia Cavaliers football